Alloporus is a genus of giant millipedes that live in deserts. It contains the following species:

 Alloporus americanus Silvestri, 1895
 Alloporus annulipes (Carl, 1917)
 Alloporus bilobatus Schubart 1966
 Alloporus capricornis (Attems, 1928)
 Alloporus carinulatus Attems, 1950
 Alloporus castaneus Attems, 1928
 Alloporus circulus Attems, 1914
 Alloporus dissimilis Porat, 1872
 Alloporus falcatus Attems 1928
 Alloporus fallax Attems 1934
 Alloporus furculifer Lawrence 1965
 Alloporus gilvitarsus (Attems, 1914)
 Alloporus hamifer Attems 1950
 Alloporus impatulus Karsch 1881
 Alloporus intermedius (Attems, 1934)
 Alloporus kindanus (Attems, 1953)
 Alloporus krausi Lawrence 1965
 Alloporus levigatus Attems 1928
 Alloporus major Lawrence 1965
 Alloporus multiannulatus (Carl, 1909)
 Alloporus nigricollis Schubart, 1947
 Alloporus peregrinus Lawrence 1965
 Alloporus porathi Karsch, 1881
 Alloporus rhodesianus Chamberlin, 1927
 Alloporus rugifrons Attems, 1928
 Alloporus transvaalensis Schubart, 1966
 Alloporus uncinatus Attems, 1914

References

Spirostreptida